Light in the Piazza is a 1962 American romantic comedy-drama film directed by Guy Green and starring Olivia de Havilland, Rossano Brazzi, Yvette Mimieux, George Hamilton, and Barry Sullivan. Based on the 1960 novel The Light in the Piazza by Elizabeth Spencer, the film is about a beautiful but mentally disabled young American woman traveling in Italy with her mother and the Italian man they meet during one leg of their trip.

Distributed by Metro-Goldwyn-Mayer, Light in the Piazza features extensive location shooting in 1960s Florence and Rome by the cinematographer Otto Heller.

Plot
While taking a summer holiday in Florence with her mother Meg, 26-year-old Clara Johnson, an American, meets and falls in love with a young Italian named Fabrizio Naccarelli, played by George Hamilton. Fabrizio is blinded by his love for Clara and believes her mental disability to be simple naivety. Meg tries to explain her daughter's condition to Fabrizio's father but the opportunity never seems to be right. Fabrizio's family are taken with Clara and her simple remarks are taken as evidence of her innocence.

Meg spends the remainder of the trip trying to keep the two lovers apart and fearing that Fabrizio or his family will discover the truth about her daughter.

She moves their holiday quickly to Rome in the hope that Clara will soon forget Fabrizio. On discovering how unhappy this has made Clara, she calls her tobacco executive husband Noel and asks him to fly to Rome to meet them. The couple discuss their daughter's future, and Noel reminds her that Clara's previous suitors have been repulsed as soon as they discover she is mentally disabled. He reminds her how much other students used to tease Clara. 

He also reveals that he has made plans for Clara to be placed in an expensive care home for the mentally disabled. Meg is set against what she sees as the incarceration of her daughter for the rest of her life. The couple argue, and Noel returns to America.

Meg realizes that Clara will have a much better life as a wealthy Italian wife with servants and inane gossip to entertain her than in such a home. She returns to Florence and does everything she can to expedite the marriage without her husband's knowledge. Fabrizio and Clara are overjoyed and plans are made for the wedding. Clara begins religious conversion to become a Catholic, and the priest instructing her is impressed with her childlike devotion to the Madonna. This, together with the Naccarelli family's connections in the Catholic Church, allows the wedding date to be set.

When Fabrizio's father glances at Clara's passport as they settle the wedding arrangements, he is suddenly alarmed and flees the church without explanation, taking Fabrizio with him. Meg fears he has somehow deduced Clara's mental age and does not want his son to marry such a person. Eventually, Signor Naccarelli visits Meg at her hotel and says she should have told him that Clara is 26. In Italian culture, a young man of 20 cannot marry an older woman without controversy. 

He tells his son of the age difference, but Fabrizio reminds his father that his age is actually 23 and that he so loves Clara that he cares nothing for this slight difference. The situation quickly is resolved in Signor Naccarelli's eyes when Clara's dowry is increased from $5,000 to $15,000 and the fact that Clara is sweet. The Signor attempts to proposition Meg but fails.

The wedding takes place in a church in Florence without Noel's presence. Afterwards, Meg asks the Signor about a man they previously saw wounded by a firearms accident; he tells her the man died. Meg then says, about her actions with Clara, that she did the right thing.

Cast
 Olivia de Havilland as Meg Johnson
 Rossano Brazzi as Signor Naccarelli
 Yvette Mimieux as Clara Johnson 
 George Hamilton as Fabrizio Naccarelli
 Barry Sullivan as Noel Johnson
 Isabel Dean as Miss Hawtree
 Nancy Nevinson as Signora Naccarelli
 Moultrie Kelsall as The Minister

Production
The story first appeared as a novella in The New Yorker in June 1960. MGM purchased film rights in August and assigned it to producer Arthur Freed, while the novel version of the story was published later that year. Julius Epstein wrote the script.

Guy Green was given the job as director on the strength of The Angry Silence.

Casting
Actresses who tested for the female lead included Dolores Hart; producers selected Yvette Mimieux.

Tomas Milian originally was cast as the Italian groom. George Hamilton campaigned actively for the role even though it had been cast and eventually succeeded, in part by persuading Ben Thau that he was suitable.

Shooting
Filming started 7 May 1961. The film was shot on location in Rome and Florence with interiors at MGM-British Studios in Borehamwood, near London, England.

Italian locations include:
 Piazza della Signoria, Florence, in which Michelangelo's statue David was then located
 Uffizi Gallery, Florence
 Via Veneto, Rome, which had its famously snarled motor traffic diverted for three shooting days
 Roma Ostiense railway station

Reception
According to MGM records, the film earned $1.2 million in the U.S. and Canada and $1 million elsewhere, resulting in a loss of $472,000.

See also
 List of American films of 1962

References

Bibliography

External links
 
 
 
 

1962 films
Films based on American novels
Metro-Goldwyn-Mayer films
1962 romantic drama films
Films about vacationing
Films directed by Guy Green
Films set in Rome
Films set in Florence
Films set in the 1960s
Films produced by Arthur Freed
American romantic drama films
Films with screenplays by Julius J. Epstein
Films scored by Mario Nascimbene
Films produced by Aida Young
Films about intellectual disability
Films shot at MGM-British Studios
1960s English-language films
1960s American films